"I Just Want to Dance with You" is a song written by John Prine and Roger Cook, and performed by American country music singer George Strait. It was released in April 1998 as the first single to his album One Step at a Time. The song is his 34th Number One single on the Billboard Hot Country Singles & Tracks chart, and his 42nd Number One single when all major trade charts are counted. Prine recorded it 12 years earlier, for his 1986 album German Afternoons.

It was also a hit for Daniel O'Donnell in 1992, reaching 20 in the UK charts.

Critical reception
Billboard magazine reviewed the song favorably, calling it a "tropical flavored li'l ditty, awash in delicate guitar work that is as tantalizing and refreshing as a summer breeze," and although the lyric was rather preschoolish, Strait's crisp co-production with Tony Brown and his appealing vocal performance should help overcome that obstacle.

Chart positions
"I Just Want to Dance with You" debuted at number 38 on the U.S. Billboard Hot Country Singles & Tracks for the week of April 18, 1998.

Year-end charts

Certifications

References 

Songs about dancing
1998 singles
George Strait songs
Songs written by Roger Cook (songwriter)
Song recordings produced by Tony Brown (record producer)
Songs written by John Prine
MCA Nashville Records singles
1998 songs